"Love U 4 Life" is a song by American R&B group Jodeci recorded for their third album, The Show, the After Party, the Hotel (1995). The song was released as the second single for the album on Halloween 1995, and peaked at number 31 on the Billboard Hot 100.

Critical reception
Gil L. Robertson IV from Cash Box wrote, "Another winner from Jodeci! This track is filled with smooth, powerful vocals that will make it a winner on the radio airwaves across the board. As usual, the group’s harmonizing is in order and the production is crisp and supports the group well."

Track listing
 Vinyl, 12"
"Love U 4 Life" (LP Version) - 5:07
"Freek'n You" (Raekwon Remix) - 5:07(feat. Raekwon)
"Love U 4 Life" (Main Pass Remix) - 4:03

Personnel
Information taken from Discogs.
Cedric "K-Ci" Hailey - Lead and Background vocals
Joel "JoJo" Hailey - Lead and Background vocals
DeVante Swing - Background vocals, Guitar, Other instruments
Mr. Dalvin - Background vocals
Additional Guitar: Darryl Pearson
Production & All Vocal Arrangements: DeVante Swing (aka DeVanté 4HISDAMNSELF ENT.)
Remixing: Mr. Dalvin (Remixes only)

Charts

Notes

1995 singles
Jodeci songs
Song recordings produced by DeVante Swing
1995 songs
Songs written by DeVante Swing
Contemporary R&B ballads
Soul ballads
1990s ballads